Augusto César may refer to:

 Augusto César (footballer, born 1968), Brazilian football manager and former left-back
 Augusto César (footballer, born 1992), Brazilian football midfielder